Raoul Prandi (born 16 August 1969) is a French former handball player. He was a member of the France men's national handball team. He was part of the team at the 1996 Summer Olympics, playing six matches. On club level he played for US Ivry in Ivry-sur-Seine.

References

1969 births
Living people
French male handball players
Handball players at the 1996 Summer Olympics
Olympic handball players of France
Handball players from Paris